Eduardo Brenta (born 8 February 1959 in Montevideo) is a Uruguayan politician. 

A member of the Broad Front, in 1989 he took part in the establishment of the moderate sector Vertiente Artiguista.

In 2010 he was appointed Minister of Labour and Social Welfare.

See also
 Cabinet of Uruguay

References

1959 births
Living people
People from Montevideo
Uruguayan people of Italian descent
Vertiente Artiguista politicians
Broad Front (Uruguay) politicians
Ministers of Labor and Social Affairs of Uruguay
Members of the Chamber of Representatives of Uruguay